"She's All I Wanna Be" (stylized in all lowercase) is a song by Canadian singer Tate McRae, released on February 4, 2022, by RCA Records as the second single from her debut studio album I Used to Think I Could Fly, released in May 2022. The song was written by McRae and Greg Kurstin, and produced by Kurstin.

Background and release
McRae launched a TikTok campaign for the song which involved teasing it in multiple videos beginning on December 11, 2021 till its release in February. She also made duets with multiple videos of other TikTok users to the song, and showcased part of the choreography for the official music video in a TikTok which attracted over 5 million views. She announced the release date on March 28, 2022, and noted that she went through 29 different mixes for the song.

Composition and lyrics 
"She's All I Wanna Be" has elements of synth-pop and alt-pop. The song describes feelings of jealousy towards a woman who seems to have it all, including the interest of McRae's significant other, who attempts to convince McRae that the woman poses no threat. Rachel Brodsky of Stereogum remarks that the song addresses "everyday gaslighting by a love interest who tells you their perfect-seeming female bestie is nothing to worry about". McRae has stated that the song was inspired by feelings of envy and self-loathing brought about by scrolling through social media. She also notes that song was originally written as a ballad, and was later reworked to "give it some upbeat punk energy". Additionally, the original demo vocals recorded for the ballad version were retained in the final released track.

Critical reception 
The song received widespread critical acclaim. Writing for Uproxx Caitlin White notes the pop-punk guitar, some glittering synths, and heavy percussion elevate the song sad girl anthem into actual anthem. Carolyn Droke of Uproxx also notes that the song solidifies McRae's pop star status. Jon Caramanica of The New York Times remarks that McRae's "dry, wiry voice is well suited to the convincingly mopey and skittish punk-pop thumper about envy". Notion notes that McRae showcases her moving storytelling abilities on the track. Music Review site, Thomas Bleach describes the song as ridiculously catchy, angsty, and an anthem with an electric energy, stating that McRae captures a euphoric catharsis which radiates through the bouncy hook, and the song will have you "ready to run around in a mosh pit while passionately screaming out every word".

Music video 
The music video for the song was released on February 11, 2022, and is inspired by the film A Chorus Line based on the 1975 stage production of the same name. The creative concept for the video was done by McRae and Michelle Dawley. The video features McRae and a group of dancers competing for a role at an audition, with McRae fixating on dancer Bailey Sok, as her main competition. The two battle throughout the audition, making it to the final cut, but ultimately lose out after forgetting their competition and dancing together as friends - which was against the rules. It shows how the other girl is still a good person, and McRae’s friend, despite many modern stereotypes. Caitlin White of Uproxx remarks that McRae and her rival, along with a colorful ensemble of other dancers, face off on the stage, dancing their way through choreography that mimics the song’s chaotic energy.

Chart performance 
The song debuted in the top ten in Ireland, Singapore and Norway, entering just outside the top ten at 11 in Canada. The song also debuted in the top 40 in Australia, Austria, Belgium, Denmark, Sweden, South Africa, New Zealand and the UK. In the US, the song debuted at 52, becoming McRae's highest debut and fourth charting song.

Live performances 
The song was performed live from Los Angeles on February 24 2022 for 'SetTheStage', a brand campaign with Sony. On June 12 2022 it was performed live at the Capital London Summertime Ball. In November 2022, McRae performed the song live at the 2022 MTV Europe Music Awards. The same month, she also performed the song live at Wetten, dass..?.

Credits and personnel

Song
 Tate McRae – vocals, composer, lyricist
 Greg Kurstin – composer, lyricist, producer, engineer
 Dave Kutch – mastering engineer
 Mark Stent – mixing engineer
 Joey Raya – engineer
 Julian Burg – engineer
 Matt Wolach – assistant engineer

Music video

 Michelle Dawley – director, creative director, choreographer
 Tusk – director, creative director, executive producer, production
 Aiden Magarian – producer
 Cookie Walukas – associate producer
 Max Dean – assistant director
 Justin McWilliams – director of photography
 Bailey Sok – lead dancer
 Jasmine Mason – dancer 
 China Taylor – dancer
 Findlay McConnell – dancer
 Emily Crouch – dancer
 Maycee Steele – dancer
 Jade Whitney – dancer 
 Deirdre Barnes – choreographer
 Jason Parsons — choreographer actor
 Kathryn McCormick — judge
 Robert Roldan — judge 
 Comfort Fedoke — judge
 Courtney Cooper – production designer 
 Siena Montesano – Tate styling
 Ryan Richman – Tate McRae hair
 Gilbert Soliz – Tate McRae make-up
 Ann-Marie Hoang – dancer styling
 Elle Reed – dancer hair and make up
 Christa Philippeaux – editor
 Matt Osborne – color 
 Marco Tornillo – sound
 Sabrina Rivera – video commissioner

Charts

Weekly charts

Year-end charts

Certifications

Release history

References

2022 singles
2022 songs
Tate McRae songs
RCA Records singles
Songs written by Tate McRae
Songs written by Greg Kurstin
Song recordings produced by Greg Kurstin